Józef Janusz Adamek (21 February 1900 – 1 October 1974) was a Polish footballer who played as a forward. He played in nine matches for the Poland national team between 1924 and 1930, representing his country at the 1924 Summer Olympics.

References

External links
 

1900 births
1974 deaths
Polish footballers
Poland international footballers
Footballers from Kraków
Association football forwards